Weberocereus tunilla is an epiphytic cactus native to Costa Rica, Nicaragua and Panama. It is the type species of Weberocereus. Its flower emits an unpleasant musky smell after opening and is pollinated by bats.

Subspecies
Weberocereus tunilla subsp. biolleyi, syns. Weberocereus biolleyi, Weberocereus panamensis – Costa Rica, Nicaragua, Panama. Stems nearly cylindrical, 4–6 mm thick. Flowers 5–6 cm long, pinkish

References 

tunilla